Catherine Colonna (born 16 April 1956) is a French diplomat and politician who serves as Minister of Europe and Foreign Affairs in the government of Prime Minister Élisabeth Borne since 20 May 2022.

Colonna previously served as Ambassador of France to the United Kingdom (2019–2022), Ambassador of France to Italy (2014–2017), Permanent Representative to OECD (2017–2019) and Permanent Representative to UNESCO (2008–2010).

Family and education 
Born at Tours, Colonna is the daughter of a farmer of Corsican origin.

After obtaining a master's degree in public law at the Université François-Rabelais of Tours, she pursued her studies at the Institut d'études politiques de Paris (public service) then École nationale d'administration (ENA) in the class of 1983 (Promotion Solidarité).

Career in the diplomatic service 
In 1983, Colonna entered diplomatic service being appointed to the Embassy of France in the United States, first in the political department, then in the press and information department.

Upon her return to Paris, Colonna oversaw European Law at the Legal Affairs Directorate of the Ministry of Foreign Affairs from 1986 to 1988. In 1988, she was promoted Technical Advisor in Minister of Public Works Maurice Faure's cabinet, under the presidency of François Mitterrand. In 1989, shortly before the fall of the Berlin Wall, she joined the Analysis and Forecasting Centre at the Ministry of Foreign Affairs, where she was put in charge of European Affairs. She later became spokeswoman of the Ministry of Foreign Affairs in 1990, in the department of Communication and Information, a position she held for five years.

In 1993, Minister of Foreign Affairs Alain Juppé and Cabinet Director Dominique de Villepin named Colonna deputy spokeswoman. Two years later, in May 1995, newly-installed President Jacques Chirac appointed her spokeswoman for the Élysée. For the following nine years, she served as the official voice of the French Republic's presidency, then left office to work as Director General of the National Centre of Cinematography (CNC) in September 2004.

Following the European Constitution referendum, Colonna returned to diplomacy, being appointed Minister Delegate for European Affairs in Prime Minister Dominique de Villepin's newly-formed government on 2 June 2005. She remained in position for two years, until 15 May 2007. From autumn 2007 until summer 2008, Colonna participated in the Commission on the White Paper on Foreign and European policy of France, led by Alain Juppé.

On 26 March 2008, Colonna was appointed as the French Permanent Representative to UNESCO.

Career in the private sector 
Since May 2008, Colonna is a member of the Fondation Chirac's Board of Directors, and was a member of the Franco-British Council.

Since May 2010, Colonna also chairs the Board of Governors of the École du Louvre.

In December 2010, Colonna joined the Paris office of international financial communications firm Brunswick as managing partner.

Return to the diplomatic service 
Colonna was appointed as the French Ambassador to Rome on 14 August 2014. She became Permanent Representative to OECD in 2017, before being appointed as the French Ambassador to London in 2019.

Amid a 2021 dispute between the United Kingdom and France over post-Brexit fishing licenses, then UK Foreign Secretary Liz Truss instructed Minister of State for Europe, Wendy Morton, to summon Colonna "to explain the disappointing and disproportionate threats made against the UK and Channel Islands."

Minister of Europe and Foreign Affairs, 2022–present

In May 2022, Colonna was named Foreign Minister in the Borne government. She is the second woman to hold this office, after the short stint by Michèle Alliot-Marie in 2010.

Early in her tenure, Colonna and Minister of the Armed Forces Sébastien Lecornu travelled to Niger together to seal a regional redeployment, making the country the hub for French troops in the Sahel region.

Honours

French
 : Officer of the Legion of Honour
 : Officer of the National Order of Merit
 : Commander of the Order of Arts and Letters

Foreign
 : Medal of the Oriental Republic of Uruguay (1997)
 : Grand Officer of the Order of the Star of Italy (2 June 2018)

References

External links 
 

|-

|-

 

1956 births
Living people
French people of Corsican descent
French people of Italian descent
University of Tours alumni
Sciences Po alumni
École nationale d'administration alumni
Ambassadors of France to Italy
Ambassadors of France to the United Kingdom
Politicians from Tours, France
Female foreign ministers
French Foreign Ministers
French women ambassadors
Permanent Delegates of France to UNESCO
Women government ministers of France
OECD officials
Members of the Borne government
Officers of the Ordre national du Mérite
Officiers of the Légion d'honneur
Commandeurs of the Ordre des Arts et des Lettres
Recipients of the Order of the Cross of Terra Mariana, 3rd Class